The 1983 Lisbon Open, also known by its sponsorship name Lights Cup, was a men's tennis tournament held in Lisbon, Portugal and played on outdoor clay courts. It was the only edition of the tournament and was held from 4 April to 10 April 1983. It was part of the Grand Prix tennis circuit as a Super Series category event. Second-seeded Mats Wilander won the singles title.

Finals

Singles

 Mats Wilander defeated  Yannick Noah 2–6, 7–6, 6–4
 It was Wilander's 2nd singles title of the year and the 6th of his career.

Doubles

 Carlos Kirmayr /  Cássio Motta defeated  Pavel Složil /  Ferdi Taygan 7–5, 6–4

References

External links
 ITF tournament edition details

Lisbon Open, 1983
Lisbon Open
Lisbon